Armathwaite Castle is in the village of Armathwaite, Cumbria, England, by the River Eden. Originally built to defend against Scottish raiders in the 15th century, it was converted into a mansion and today is a Grade II* listed building.

Details 

Armathwaite Castle was built in the 15th century on a strong point along the west side of the River Eden by the Skelton family. Although the precise date of its construction cannot be ascertained it was most probably constructed by John Skelton in 1445. The Skelton family appears to have been a well known family, being the representatives of the county and the city of Carlisle at the parliament. The castle was a four-storied pele tower with the facade constructed from hewn stone and protected the Eden valley from Scottish raiders. The castle estate also includes a Benedictine nunnery called Nun's Close. The founder of this nunnery is now known, with some sources naming William Rufus, while other disagreeing and stating that he founded a religious house at the nunnery, not the nunnery itself.

The Skeltons resided at the castle till 1712, when Richard Skelton sold the castle to William Sanderson. Robert Sanderson Milbourne (1660–1741), inherited the castle from his brother in 1727. Robert was assistant to Thomas Rymer in preparing the massive 20-volume Foedera (a compilation of treaties between England and foreign states from 1066 to 1654), and he made the castle the centre of a collection of antiquities and relics. It passed to the Milbournes and in 1846 onto William Lowther, the 2nd Earl of Lonsdale. It was reported in 1892 that the castle had fallen into disrepair. In the early 19th century the castle was converted into a mansion, faced with ashlar cut stone in a classical style, with an adjacent wing for offices.

Today the castle is privately owned.

See also 

 Grade II* listed buildings in Eden District
 Listed buildings in Hesket, Cumbria
 Castles in Great Britain and Ireland
 List of castles in England

References

Bibliography

External links 

  

Castles in Cumbria
Grade II* listed buildings in Cumbria
Eden District